Saint Philip II of Moscow (11 February 1507 – 23 December 1569) was the Metropolitan of Moscow and all Rus' from 1567 to 1568. He was the thirteenth Metropolitan in Moscow to be appointed without the approval of the Ecumenical Patriarch of Constantinople as had been the norm.

He was one of a few Metropolitans who dared openly to contradict Ivan the Terrible. It is widely believed that the Tsar had him murdered on that account. He is venerated as a saint and martyr in the Eastern Orthodox Church.

Life
He was born Feodor Stepanovich Kolychev into one of the noblest boyar families of Muscovy, in the city of Galich (in present-day Kostroma Oblast). However, according to some sources, he was born in Moscow. Grand Prince Vasili III took young Theodore into the royal court.  It is said that since childhood Theodore was on friendly terms with Ivan IV of Russia ("Ivan the Terrible"). 

According to other accounts, he was involved in the conspiracy of Prince Andrey of Staritsa against Elena Glinskaya and, when their plans were discovered, he escaped to Solovetsky Monastery on the White Sea. Yet another account says that his decision to become a monk occurred on Sunday 5 June 1537, while he was standing in church for the Divine Liturgy, on hearing the words of Jesus: "No man can serve two masters". According to this account, he secretly left Moscow dressed as a muzhik (peasant), and for a while he hid himself away from the world in the village of Khizna, near Lake Onega, earning his livelihood as a shepherd, later joining the monastery at Solovetsk. At any rate, he entered the monastery at Solovki at the age of 30, and a year and a half later he was tonsured (took monastic vows), receiving the religious name of Philip. In the monastery he worked at the iron forge and as a baker.

Eleven years later, Philip was made hegumen (abbot) of the monastery. During his term in office, they constructed two cathedrals, a brick-yard, many water-mills and storehouses, and a network of canals connecting 72 lakes. It is said that Philip took part in all these toils together with other monks. As a result, the monastery experienced a spiritual revival. He also adopted a new monastic Rule (Typicon) for the community. Most of Philip's projects in Solovki survive to this day.

The tsar heard about the indefatigable monk and asked him to fill the vacant metropolitan see of Moscow. Philip agreed on condition that Ivan would abolish Oprichnina. On 25 June 1566 Philip was consecrated a bishop and enthroned as Metropolitan of Moscow and all Russia.

After only two years, however, Ivan the Terrible persisted with committing murders under the aegis of Oprichnina. During Great Lent, on the Sunday of the Veneration of the Cross, 2 March 1568, when the Tsar came to the cathedral for Divine Liturgy, Philip refused to bless him and publicly rebuked him for the ongoing massacre. The Massacre of Novgorod ensued, and Philip's condemnation followed.

Ivan eventually deposed Philip from office by raising incredible charges of sorcery and dissolute living. Philip was arrested during Liturgy at the Cathedral of Dormition and imprisoned in a dingy cell of the Theophany (Bogoiavlenskii) Monastery, fettered with chains, with a heavy collar around his neck, and was deprived of food for a few days in succession. Then he was transferred and immured at the Monastery of the Fathers (Otroch Monastery) at Tver. In November 1568, the tsar summoned the Holy Synod, which had Philip deposed. A year later, on 23 December 1569, he was strangled by the Tsar's minion, Malyuta Skuratov at Otroch, two days before Christmas. As if aware of his approaching death, Philip had asked to receive Holy Communion three days earlier.

Commemoration as a saint

After his martyrdom, monks from Solovki Monastery asked for permission to transfer the body of St. Philip to their monastery. When they opened up the tomb they found the body of the hierarch was incorrupt, and various healings began to be reported. The transfer of his remains from Tver to the Solovki Monastery took place in 1590.

In 1652, Patriarch Nikon persuaded Tsar Alexis to bring Philip's relics to Moscow, where he was glorified (proclaimed a saint) later that same year.  His memory is celebrated three times a year: 
His main feast day falls on 9 January (for those churches which follow the traditional Julian Calendar, 9 January falls on 22 January of the modern Gregorian Calendar).
The feast of the translation of his relics is celebrated on 3 July (16 July).
On 5 October (18 October) he is celebrated as one of the Hierarchs of Moscow. The celebration of a special day (Synaxis) to honor Saints Peter, Alexis, and Jonah as "Metropolitans and Wonderworkers of All Russia" was established by Patriarch Job in 1596. In 1875, St. Innocent, Metropolitan of Moscow proposed that St. Philip be included with the others.

Appearances in modern media
 Ivan the Terrible, a Soviet era film about Ivan IV of Russia
 Tsar, a 2009 Russian drama film directed by Pavel Lungin.

References

Sources
Attwater, Donald and Catherine Rachel John. The Penguin Dictionary of Saints. 3rd edition. New York: Penguin Books, 1993.

External links
Hieromartyr Philip the Metropolitan of Moscow and All Russia Orthodox icon and synaxarion for 9 January
Translation of the relics of Hieromartyr Philip the Metropolitan of Moscow 3 July
Synaxis of the Hierarchs of Moscow 5 October
Translation of the Relics of our Father among the Saints Metropolitan Philip

1507 births
1569 deaths
Russian saints of the Eastern Orthodox Church
Metropolitans of Kiev and all Rus' (Patriarchate of Moscow)
16th-century Christian saints
Bakers